Paul Viorel Anton (born 10 May 1991) is a Romanian professional footballer who plays as a defensive midfielder for Liga I club UTA Arad.

Club career

Early years
In 2008, Anton began his career with his hometown club Gloria Bistrița, being promoted from the juniors. In the same year, he was loaned to Delta Tulcea, where he played a season and scored 4 goals in 27 Liga II matches. However, after the loan to Delta Tulcea, Anton was sent to the Gloria Bistrița's reserves, where he played a season, after being loaned to FCM Târgu Mureș, and in 2010 he returned to the first team. In his first Liga I campaign with Bistrița, he appeared in 18 matches and scored one goal. The club relegated in 2011 and promoted back in first division a year after.

Pandurii Târgu Jiu
On 7 January 2013, Anton signed a deal with Pandurii Târgu Jiu. In the 2012–13 season, he played 13 matches and scored three times in the Liga I for Pandurii, including two goals against CS Turnu Severin, helping his team in the 3–1 win. Coming as runner-ups in the league, the club earned a place in the UEFA Europa League and Anton was used as a starter in all the 10 matches played in that competition.

Dinamo București
On 7 September 2015, Anton signed a contract with Dinamo București. Three days later, he made his debut in a 2–0 Cupa Ligii victory over his former team Pandurii Târgu Jiu. Anton scored his first goal for "the Red Dogs" in a league match with FC Voluntari on 30 November.

Anton agreed to a season-long loan deal with Spanish club Getafe on 28 July 2016. He made 32 appearances and scored two goals all competitions comprised as El Geta achieved promotion to the La Liga.

Anzhi Makhachkala
On 29 December 2017, Russian team Anzhi Makhachkala signed Anton on a two-and-a-half-year contract. Two weeks before the official announcement, Romanian press reported the transfer fee at €500,000.

Anton made his debut for Anzhi on 2 March 2018, starting in a 1–1 league draw to Rubin Kazan. His first goals for the club came on 17 March, when he netted both in a 2–0 win over FC Tosno.

Krylia Sovetov Samara
On 21 August 2018, Anton signed a three-year contract with PFC Krylia Sovetov Samara. He left Krylia Sovetov on 10 August 2020, following club's relegation from the Russian Premier League.

Ponferradina
On 28 August 2021, after one year back at Dinamo București, Anton signed for SD Ponferradina in the Spanish Segunda División. On 4 September of the following year, he agreed to terminate his contract with the club.

UTA Arad
On 5 September 2022, he came back to Romania signing a contract with UTA Arad

International career
Anton made his full debut for Romania on 24 March 2018, replacing Mihai Pintilii in the 72nd minute in a 2–1 friendly win against Israel.

Career statistics

Club

International

Honours
FCM Târgu Mureș
Liga II: 2009–10

Pandurii Târgu Jiu
Cupa Ligii runner-up: 2014–15

Dinamo București
Cupa României runner-up: 2015–16

References

External links

1991 births
Living people
Sportspeople from Bistrița
Romanian footballers
Association football midfielders
Liga I players
Liga II players
ACF Gloria Bistrița players
FC Delta Dobrogea Tulcea players
ASA 2013 Târgu Mureș players
CS Pandurii Târgu Jiu players
FC Dinamo București players
Segunda División players
Getafe CF footballers
Russian Premier League players
FC Anzhi Makhachkala players
PFC Krylia Sovetov Samara players
SD Ponferradina players
FC UTA Arad players
Romania under-21 international footballers
Romania international footballers
Romanian expatriate footballers
Expatriate footballers in Spain
Romanian expatriate sportspeople in Spain
Expatriate footballers in Russia
Romanian expatriate sportspeople in Russia
21st-century Romanian people